Ttongppang (똥빵, literally feces bread or "poo bread"), or Ddongbbang, is a Korean bread sold at street markets. It is the shape of stylized human feces and is filled with red bean paste and walnut bits. It originated in Insa-dong, Seoul, South Korea.

See also
 Gyeranppang, Similar Korean food
 List of Korean dishes
 Korean cuisine

References

External links
 Google image of Ttongppang 

Korean cuisine
Breads
Street food